Events in the year 1887 in Iceland.

Incumbents 

 Monarch: Christian IX
 Minister for Iceland: Johannes Nellemann

Events 

 Grímsvötn erupted.

Births 

 16 April – Guðjón Samúelsson, state architect
 16 or 11 October – Stefán Sigurðsson, poet

References 

 
1880s in Iceland
Years of the 19th century in Iceland
Iceland
Iceland